Proletarskyi is an urban-type settlement in the Rovenky Raion of the Luhansk Oblast of Ukraine. Population: 

In 2016 the city was renamed Kartushyne as part of decommunization in Ukraine. The city's name change process is temporarily suspended as it not fully controlled by the government of Ukraine.

References

Urban-type settlements in Rovenky Raion